Afghanistan participated in the 2010 Summer Youth Olympics.

Athletics

Note: The athletes who do not have a "Q" next to their Qualification Rank advance to a non-medal ranking final.

Boys
Track and road events

Boxing

References

External links 
Competitors List: Afghanistan

Nations at the 2010 Summer Youth Olympics
2010 in Afghan sport
Afghanistan at the Youth Olympics